Mathieu Cornet (born 8 August 1990) is a Belgian footballer who currently plays as a striker for FC Wiltz 71.

Club career
On 24 July 2018, Cornet joined Mechelen on a two-year deal after two years with KSV Roeselare.

On 13 August 2019, he joined RWDM47 on a season-long loan.

Honours
Mechelen
 Belgian Cup: 2018–19

References

External links
 

1990 births
Living people
Sportspeople from Namur (city)
Association football defenders
Belgian footballers
Beerschot A.C. players
K.S.K. Tongeren players
R.E. Virton players
K.V. Oostende players
Royal Antwerp F.C. players
K.S.V. Roeselare players
K.V. Mechelen players
RWDM47 players
Belgian Pro League players
Challenger Pro League players
Footballers from Namur (province)